Lawrence Stadium may refer to

in Arizona
 J. Lawrence Walkup Skydome in Flagstaff, Arizona

in California
 Tony Zupo Field, originally known as Lawrence Park, in Lodi, California

in Kansas
 Lawrence–Dumont Stadium in Wichita, Kansas
 Memorial Stadium (University of Kansas) in Lawrence, Kansas
 Haskell Memorial Stadium in Lawrence, Kansas
 Hoglund Ballpark in Lawrence, Kansas
 McCook Field (stadium) in Lawrence, Kansas

in Massachusetts
 Veterans Memorial Stadium in Lawrence, Massachusetts

in New York
 Robert K. Kraft Field at Lawrence A. Wien Stadium in Manhattan, New York

See also
 List of stadiums in North America